Adrian Dubois (born April 16, 1987) is an American former soccer player, who is current an assistant coach for the University of Vermont men's soccer team.

Career

College and amateur
Adrian Dubois attended Fall Mountain Regional High School in Langdon, New Hampshire, where he was a 2004 NSCAA/adidas High School Boys All-Region I (New England) selection, played college soccer at the University of New Hampshire, and spent two seasons in the USL Premier Development League with the Albany Admirals and the New Hampshire Phantoms.

Professional
Dubois turned professional in 2009 with the Western Mass Pioneers, and made his pro debut on April 25, 2009, in Western Mass's 3-1 opening day defeat to the Harrisburg City Islanders. He scored his first two career goals on June 5, 2009, in a 2-1 win over Crystal Palace Baltimore, and went on to play in 20 league games for the Pioneers, but was released at the end of the year when the Pioneers self-relegated to the PDL.

Having been unable to secure a professional contract elsewhere, Dubois returned to play for the New Hampshire Phantoms in the USL Premier Development League in 2010.

Coaching 
In 2019, Dubois became an assistant coach for the University of Vermont men's soccer team.

References

External links
Pioneers bio

1987 births
Living people
American soccer players
Albany BWP Highlanders players
Seacoast United Phantoms players
Western Mass Pioneers players
Orange County SC players
USL League Two players
USL Second Division players
USL Championship players
Association football midfielders
People from Acworth, New Hampshire
Vermont Catamounts men's soccer coaches
Soccer players from New Hampshire